Daliyat el-Karmel ("vineyards (دالية) of Carmel") is a Druze town located on Mount Carmel in the Haifa District of Israel, around 20 km southeast of Haifa.

History
In 1283 both Daliyat al-Karmel and  Kh.  Doubel (just south of Daliyat al-Karmel) were mentioned as part of the domain of the Crusaders, according to the hudna between the Crusaders in Acre and the Mamluk sultan Qalawun.

In 1870 a local guide showed French explorer Victor Guérin extensive ruins located south of Daliyat al-Karmel, called Khirbet Doubel. The ruins were the most extensive on Mount Carmel. Guérin thought it might be the town on Mt. Carmel mentioned by Pliny. Conder and Kitchener of the Palestine Exploration Fund surveyed the area and noted  "traces of ruins" at a place SE of the village centre called Dubil. Later excavations have found remains there from Iron Age I, Early Roman and  Byzantine periods, together with pottery from first century to the second–third centuries CE. Although inconclusive, Lieutenant Conder thought that Daliyat al-Karmel was to be identified with the biblical Idalah (Joshua 19:15).

Ottoman era

Mount Carmel was progressively settled by Druze beginning in the early 17th century, when a large part of Palestine came under the jurisdiction of Fakhr al-Din II, the paramount Druze strongman of Mount Lebanon and Ottoman governor of the Sidon-Beirut and Safad districts. Druze from the Yamani tribo-political faction may have also migrated to Mount Carmel from Mount Lebanon in the aftermath of the Battle of Ain Dara in 1711, though most of the migration was directed to the Jabal Hauran. Six out of the eight Druze villages established on Mount Carmel were abandoned or destroyed during Egyptian rule in the Levant (1831–1840). The local accounts recorded by Laurence Oliphant, who built himself a summer house in Daliyat al-Karmil in the 1880s, hold that the villages were abandoned for Jabal Hauran due to the oppressive rule of the governor Ibrahim Pasha, while Conder noted that the villages were destroyed by Ibrahim Pasha. Daliyat al-Karmil and Isfiya were the sole Druze settlements left standing on Mount Carmel. The local traditional trace Daliyat al-Karmel's founding to the 18th century when a Druze family from Jabal al-A'la near Aleppo settled on ancient ruins in the village. Successive waves of Druze families from Jabal al-A'la followed and together they formed the Halaby ("Aleppine") clan. Until today the Halaby clan of the town speaks in the Aleppine Arabic dialect rather than the Palestinian dialect.

In 1870 Guérin found four hundred Druze inhabitants in Daliyat al-Karmel. The houses were mostly built of adobe, with only a few stone houses. The locals worshiped inside a cave, where the explorer was not allowed. In 1881 the Palestine Exploration Fund's Survey of Western Palestine described the village as a "stone village of moderate size on a knoll of one of the spurs running out of the main watershed of Carmel. On the south there is a well, and fine springs on the west, near Umm esh Shukf. On the north is a little plain or open valley cultivated with corn (Merjat ed Dalieh). The inhabitants are all Druses." A population list from about 1887 showed that Daliyat al-Karmel had about 620 inhabitants, all Druze.

British Mandate era
In the 1922 census of Palestine conducted by the British Mandate authorities, Daliyat al-Karmel had a population of 993; 921 Druse and 21 Christians, increasing in the 1931 census when Daliyat al-Karmel, together Deir el Muhraqa and  Khirbat al-Mansura had a total population of 1,173, of whom 1,154 were Druze, 11 were Christians and 8 were Muslims, living in a total of 236 houses. In the 1945 statistics the population of Daliyat al-Karmel consisted of 2,060 Arabs, (20 Christians and 2,040 Druze). The land area was 31,730 dunams, according to an official land and population survey, of which 1,506 dunams were designated for plantations and irrigable land, 18,174 for cereals, and 60 were built-up (urban) areas.

State of Israel

An Israeli census conducted in November 1948 found 2,932 residents. At the end of 1951 the figure dropped to 2,769.
The town was granted local council status that year. In 2003 Daliyat al-Karmel was merged with Isfiya to form Carmel City. In 2008, the communities became separate once again. The town is famous for its colorful market.

In 2010, El Al, Israel's national airline, named one of its Boeing 767 airplanes Daliyat al-Karmel. Sheikh Muafak Tarif, leader of the Druze community, was presented with a miniature model of the plane at a special ceremony. According to Israel Central Bureau of Statistics, in 2016 Daliyat al-Karmel's population was 17,000. The majority of residents are Druze (97.2%), with Muslim (2.7%) and Christian (0.1%) minorities.

Landmarks

Abu Ibrahim shrine

The shrine of Abu Ibrahim, whom the Druze consider a prophet, is in the oldest part of the town.

Laurence Oliphant House

Close by the Abu Ibrahim shrine is the home of Sir Laurence Oliphant, who spent his summers there in the 1880s with his wife Alice, and his secretary Naftali Herz Imber. The building functions as a museum, the Druze Memorial Center, commemorating the 505 Druze IDF soldiers who have died in the line of duty since 1948.

Sir Laurence Oliphant, was a South African-born British author, traveller, diplomat, British intelligence agent, Christian mystic, and Christian Zionist. His best known book in his lifetime was a satirical novel, Piccadilly (1870).

Muhraqa Carmelite Monastery

The Catholic Muhraqa Monastery is located 2 kilometres southeast of Dalyat al-Karmel and marks the contest between prophet Elijah and the priests of Ba'al. It belongs to the Carmelite Order. Also the Catholic complex includes a chapel that was built in 1883, and gardens which includes a Virgin Mary Statue, and the lodgings of monks from the Carmelite Order.

Druze Heritage Center
The Carmel Center for Druze Heritage is a hands-on museum of the history, religion and culture of the Druze.

Garden of the Mothers
In 2011, the Garden of the Mothers was inaugurated in Daliyat al-Karmel, symbolizing the sisterhood of Christian, Druze, Jewish, and Muslim women who work together in northern Israel. Forty-four trees were planted in memory of the 44 Israel Prison Services personnel who died in the Mount Carmel forest fire in 2010.

Culture and sports

In 2012, a tennis school financed by the Freddie Krivine Foundation opened in Daliyat al-Karmel and 12 youngsters take part in a weekly co-existence program with children at the Israel Tennis Center in Yokneam.

Mevo Carmel high-tech park 
Daliyat al-Karmel and Isfiya joined Yokneam Illit and the Megiddo Regional Council to develop the Mevo Carmel Jewish-Arab Industrial Park  to benefit from the existing high-tech ecosystem.

Twin cities
In 2007, Daliyat al-Karmel signed a partnership agreement with Ungheni, Moldova. In 2008, the Ambassador of Moldova, Larisa Miculet visited Daliyat al-Karmel at the invitation of the mayor, Akram Hasson.

Notable people

 Amal Nasser el-Din, former Likud MK
 Majdi Halabi, Israeli missing soldier
 Ayoob Kara, Likud MK
 Gadeer Mreeh, MK

See also
Arab localities in Israel
Druze in Israel

References

Bibliography

  

 

  
 
  

Mülinen, Egbert Friedrich von 1908, Beiträge zur Kenntnis des Karmels "Separateabdruck aus der Zeitschrift des Deutschen Palëstina-Vereins Band XXX (1907) Seite 117-207 und Band XXXI (1908) Seite 1-258."  ("Daliet el-kirmil": p. 242 ff. )

External links
Welcome To Daliyat al-Carmel
Israel tourist board: Daliyat al-Carmel  
Survey of Western Palestine, Map 5:    IAA, Wikimedia commons 

Arab localities in Israel
Druze communities in Israel
Local councils in Haifa District
Mount Carmel